Laurent Dauwe (born 16 January 1966) is a retired Belgian football midfielder.

References

1966 births
Living people
Belgian footballers
K.A.A. Gent players
K.V. Kortrijk players
R.E. Mouscron players
Beerschot A.C. players
K.V.C. Westerlo players
K.V. Oostende players
Royal Antwerp F.C. players
Belgian Pro League players
Association football midfielders
K.R.C. Gent players